The Condor is a 4×4 wheeled armoured personnel carrier originally designed by Thyssen-Henschel of Germany and manufactured by Henschel Wehrtechnik GmbH. The first prototype was completed in 1978. The Condor was designed as a successor to its UR-416 APC. The upgraded Condor 2 was first sold in 2004. Today, the Condor is considered a legacy product of Rheinmetall MAN Military Vehicles, part of Rheinmetall's Vehicle Systems Division. The nearest vehicle to the Condor in RMMV's current product range is the Survivor R.

Design 

The Condor is designed primarily as an APC but it can also adopted for a variety of other roles including anti-tank, cargo carrier, command vehicle, ambulance, fitters' vehicle and reconnaissance vehicle.
The Condor is based on the automotives of the Mercedes-Benz Unimog, the Condor 2 based on the Unimog U5000. The hull of the Condor is made of all-welded armoured steel protecting the crew from 7.62 mm armour-piercing (AP) rounds and 5.56 mm ball-type rounds, shell splinters and anti-personnel mines.
The Condor is fully amphibious, propelled in the water by a propeller mounted under the rear of the hull. It is air-transportable in C-130 Hercules and in C-160 Transall type aircraft.

In 2016, Deftech showed a working upgraded Condor prototype at the DSA 2016 convention. A Condor prototype converted to serve as a logistics transport vehicle was unveiled at the DSA 2018 convention.

Operators 
: Kuwait's National Guard received 8 Condor 2 in 2010.
: Malaysia ordered 460 Condor APCs in late 1981, with the last being delivered in March 1984. It's due to be replaced completely under the Next Generation Wheeled Armoured Vehicle project.
: Portugal has 12 Condor; these are operated by the Polícia Aérea of the Portuguese Air Force. 
: South Korea, 2 Condor 1 (used in general hospital)
: Thailand received 18 Condor in 1995, these are operated by the Royal Thai Air Force)
: Turkey has 25 Condor (inactive; currently being retired).
: Uruguay has 55 Condor.

See also
Thyssen Henschel UR-416
TM-170

References

External links 
Malaysian Condor upgrade
Condor test drive

Wheeled armoured personnel carriers
Armoured personnel carriers of Germany
Wheeled amphibious armoured fighting vehicles
Armoured personnel carriers of the Cold War